"Just One More" is a 1956 country music song by American artist George Jones. It was released as a single on Starday Records in 1956 reached #3 on the Billboard country singles chart.  The song is often featured on his early compilation albums and was one of the most successful of his self-penned songs.

Background
"Just One More" is one of the earliest examples of the "hard" drinking songs for which Jones would become famous.  The song describes a lonely, self-pitying man who is drinking to forget his worries:

Although he would adopt a more nuanced, quieter vocal approach in the next decade, Jones' performance on "Just One More" displays his incredible vocal range and power and sounds very much like a composition his hero Hank Williams could have sung.  The slow honky-tonk beat is accompanied by a fiddle and steel guitar throughout. Like Williams, Jones had already been tagged as a problem drinker very early on in his career.  In the liner notes to the 1994 Mercury retrospective Cup of Loneliness: The Classic Mercury Years, Colin Escott quotes the singer from an interview with John Dew: "[In] the dives and honky tonks the drunks were always blowing foul breath in my face, and the smell of whiskey was enough to knock you down if you hadn't had a few yourself.  Drinking gives me courage.  I'm easily depressed.  I can feel it creeping up, and the best way to simmer down is with a drink."

Ernest Tubb covered the tune in 1956. In 1960 Johnny Cash recorded the song for his LP Now, There Was a Song!

Chart performance

References 

1956 songs
1956 singles
George Jones songs
Songs about alcohol
Starday Records singles
Songs written by George Jones